The Gypsy Hill killings were a group of five homicides of young women and girls in San Mateo County, California, during early 1976. The killer became known in the media as the “San Mateo Slasher." It was later proven that there were at least two different perpetrators.

Killings
On January 8, 1976, the body of 18-year-old Veronica Cascio was discovered in a creek on the grounds of the Sharp Park Golf Course in Pacifica. She had been stabbed 30 times. A transient was arrested but was released for lack of evidence.

A few weeks later, 14-year-old Tatiana Blackwell was reported missing after leaving her home in Pacifica to run an errand. A body, later identified as hers, was discovered off Sharp Park Road in the Gypsy Hills section of the city on June 6. She had also been stabbed multiple times.

Paula Baxter, 17 years old, went missing on Wednesday evening February 4th, after finishing a play rehearsal on the Capuchino High school campus, leaving her mired car behind. Her nude body was found on February 6 in Millbrae behind the Church of Jesus Christ of Latter-day Saints on Ludeman Lane. She had been stabbed 4 times, sexually assaulted, and hit on the head with a piece of concrete. Her killing was forensically linked to Cascio's.

On April 1, 19-year-old Denise Lampe of Broadmoor was found dead after a search in the parking lot of the Serramonte Center. She had been stabbed 20 times.

Carol Booth, 26, was reported missing by her husband on March 15, and was discovered in a shallow grave near Colma Creek on Grand Avenue in South San Francisco on May 6.

Victims
The five victims were:
Veronica "Ronnie" Cascio
Tatiana Marie "Tanya" Blackwell
Paula Louise Baxter
Carol Lee Booth
Denise Lampe

Possible victims
Michelle Mitchell

Mitchell, 19, was last seen alive in Reno, Nevada, on February 24, 1976, when her Volkswagen Beetle broke down at the intersection of 9th Street and Evans Avenue. Witnesses reported seeing someone help push her vehicle into the parking lot across from the UNR agricultural building on Evans Street.

Her body was discovered that evening in a garage on East 9th Street with her hands bound and her throat slashed. Three years later, Cathy Woods, a psychiatric patient at the Louisiana State University Medical Center, confessed to having murdered a woman named Michelle. Woods was charged and convicted of murdering Michelle Mitchell. She was released from prison in 2015, 35 years later, at the age of 68 after DNA evidence cleared her. Cathy Woods is the longest-ever wrongfully imprisoned woman in US history.

Idell M. Friedman

Friedman, 21, an employee of an import firm, was found assaulted and stabbed to death with an 8-inch-knife in her apartment at 116 Fairmount Street in San Francisco. She was murdered on March 17, 1976, only two days after Gypsy Hill victim Carol Lee Booth was reported missing.

Friedman's nude body was lying on the kitchen floor of her ransacked apartment. She was found by a co-worker who became concerned when Friedman did not show up for work.

Investigation and arrests
Investigators have connected some of the homicides to each other. All the slain women were young brunettes and most had experienced car trouble prior to being murdered. All the bodies were found in wooded areas.

A lack of witnesses and forensic evidence stalled the investigations.

In March 2014, the FBI established a task force to re-examine the murders, after new DNA evidence cast doubt on the conviction of Cathy Woods, now 64, for Mitchell's murder. The DNA taken from a cigarette butt found at the Mitchell crime scene matched DNA taken from semen found at related crime scenes in San Mateo, California. This DNA was that of a man and therefore might exonerate Woods.

On September 8, 2014, the FBI named Rodney Halbower as a person of interest in the Gypsy Hill murders. Woods was released from prison on September 11 pending a new trial to take place on July 13, 2015. In March 2015, prosecutors dismissed the charges against Woods.

On January 22, 2015, Halbower was charged with two of the murders (Paula Baxter and Veronica Cascio).  DNA evidence linked him to both. On November 8, 2017, Leon Melvin Seymour was charged with the murder of Denise Lampe, based on DNA evidence. On September 18, 2018, Halbower was convicted of the murders of Cascio and Baxter. Finally, on October 10, 2018, Halbower was sentenced to two consecutive life sentences without the possibility of parole for the murders of Cascio and Baxter. 

Halbower will most likely face a trial in Nevada for the murder of Michelle Mitchell in the near future.

The murders of Tanya Blackwell and Carol Lee Booth are both believed to have been committed by Rodney Halbower, but there was not enough evidence to charge him for their deaths.

See also 
List of fugitives from justice who disappeared
List of serial killers in the United States

References

Bibliography

External links 

1976 in California
1976 murders in the United States
American murder victims
Crimes in California
Female murder victims
Fugitives
History of women in California
Incidents of violence against women
Murder in the San Francisco Bay Area
Murdered American children
People murdered in California
Serial murders in the United States
Sexual assaults in the United States
Unidentified American serial killers
Unsolved murders in the United States